Antioch is a village in the U.S. state of Illinois. Antioch is part of the larger Antioch Township within Lake County. As of the 2020 census, the population was 14,622. The village is nestled into the Chain O'Lakes waterway system and borders the state of Wisconsin. Part of the Chicago metropolitan area, Antioch is located approximately halfway between the major cities of Chicago (60 miles south) and Milwaukee (50 miles north).

History

Native American history 
The Pottawatomi Tribe historically inhabited in the area of present-day Antioch prior to European settlement. The tribe was pushed to the west by European/American encroachment in the 1830s although remnants can still be found today.

European settlement
The first permanent European settlements in the region were along the creek, named as “Sequoit” which means “winding” in Indian. Darius and Thomas Gage brothers built the first cabin. After building a sawmill by Hiram Buttrick on Sequoit Creek, a tributary of the Fox River, the region became a center of commerce. In 1843, new settlers gave a biblical name “Antioch” to the region and started a school. The town grew as new settlers, primarily of English and German descent, established farms and businesses. In 1976, a replica of Buttrick's mill was built a few hundred feet downstream from where it once stood. Today, many local businesses and organizations as well as Antioch Community High School use the name "Sequoit".

Partly due to being a regional center of the abolitionist movement, Antioch is noted as having sent a disproportionately high number of its young men to the Union Army. By the late 1800s, Antioch became a popular vacation spot for Chicagoans and tourism grew quickly once the rail line to Chicago was laid in 1886. Fire destroyed much of downtown in 1891, 1903, and 1904. During Prohibition, Al Capone owned a summer home on nearby Bluff Lake. Following World War II, Antioch continued to see a steady population and economic increase, and an industrial park was created in the 1970s.

Today, Antioch serves as a bedroom community within the Chicago metropolitan and Milwaukee metropolitan area.

Geography
Antioch is approximately halfway between Chicago and Milwaukee at  (42.479069, -88.090878).

The village lies in a gently rolling moraine landscape, dominated by lakes of glacial origin. Among these are the Antioch Lake, south of the village center, Lake Marie, west of the village center and the Redwing Slough Lake, east of the village center. There are several smaller lakes and ponds, and a complement of wetlands.

Climate
Like Chicago, Antioch lies in a humid continental climate zone and experiences four distinct seasons.

Demographics

2020 census

Note: the US Census treats Hispanic/Latino as an ethnic category. This table excludes Latinos from the racial categories and assigns them to a separate category. Hispanics/Latinos can be of any race.

2010 Census
As of the 2010 United States Census, there were 14,430 people living in the village. The racial makeup of the village was 88.79% White, 3.08% Black or African American, 3.73% Asian, 0.17% Native American, 0.10% Pacific Islander, 2.04% of some other race and 2.09% of two or more races. 8.53% were Hispanic or Latino (of any race).

As of the census of 2000, there were 8,788 people, 3,235 households, and 2,351 families living in the village. The racial makeup of the village was 95.19% White, 1.07% African American, 0.35% Native American, 1.16% Asian, 0.01% Pacific Islander, 1.08% from other races, and 1.14% from two or more races. Hispanic or Latino of any race were 4.42% of the population.

There were 3,235 households, out of which 41.9% had children under the age of 18 living with them, 56.4% were married couples living together, 12.2% had a female householder with no husband present, and 27.3% were non-families. 22.2% of all households were made up of individuals, and 7.9% had someone living alone who was 65 years of age or older. The average household size was 2.72 and the average family size was 3.20.

In the village, the population was spread out, with 29.9% under the age of 18, 8.0% from 18 to 24, 32.4% from 25 to 44, 21.1% from 45 to 64, and 8.5% who were 65 years of age or older. The median age was 34 years. For every 100 females, there were 95.5 males. For every 100 females age 18 and over, there were 88.9 males.

The median income for a household in the village was $56,481, and the median income for a family was $66,589. Males had a median income of $51,503 versus $31,389 for females. The per capita income for the village was $25,711. About 2.3% of families and 3.9% of the population were below the poverty line, including 3.9% of those under age 18 and 8.0% of those age 65 or over.

Economy 
Since 1996, Metra's North Central Service has played an increasingly important role in Antioch's development. Weekday train service to and from Chicago has given rise to new commercial development near the train depot. The village continues to undergo commercial and residential growth, mostly along the Illinois Route 173 corridor.

Antioch is home to the Pickard China factory which makes fine china for Air Force One, Camp David, and others.

Downtown Antioch is home to distinctive clothing boutiques, eateries, bars, gift and décor shops, and specialty shops. It also hosts concerts in a bandshell, craft fairs, parades, festivals, art walks, gardening tours and more.

Arts and culture
Antioch has been home to the Palette, Masque and Lyre, Inc. (PM&L) Performing Arts theatre since 1960. In addition, the Antioch Fine Arts Foundation (AFAF), serving Antioch, Greater Lake County, IL and Southeast WI since 2001. AFAF is a not-for-profit organization whose function is to coordinate and promote area arts programs. AFAF offers a gallery, regular special exhibits, an artists' library, classes, workshops, and other special events. Membership is open to artists, patrons of the arts, and anyone interested in art appreciation. The AFAF Gallery is a not-for-profit gallery staffed by member volunteers. The gallery displays work by area artists and presents exhibits of unique diversity and excellence. Throughout the year, the gallery hosts special receptions and openings for artists' new works. The AFAF Gallery is conveniently located at 983 Main Street, Antioch, Illinois 60002 (corner of Main (Rt. 83) and Ida). AFAF Gallery also hosts a casual folk music presentation on the second Saturday of every month from 1 to 4 pm. The music is free, and open to the public.

Library
The Antioch Public Library is located at 757 Main Street (Route 83). The collection of the library contains 135,716 volumes and circulates 371,105 items per year.

The Antioch Public Library began as an Antioch Women's Club project in 1921. Initially the Women's Club raised funds for the establishment of a village library and the residents donated books for the library. This first village library was located at 934 Main Street and was open only two days a week. In 1922 the library was moved to the Antioch Village Hall at 875 Main Street. In 1930 the library was moved again to the corner of Main Street and Depot Street. In 1941, the Library was moved again to 883 Main Street. In 1950 William Schroeder family donated the property located at 757 Main Street to the Village of Antioch for use as a library. The new library building was officially opened in 1970. In August 2001 construction began of an 18,000-square-foot addition to the Antioch Public Library facility. The construction was completed in January 2003.

Recreation
The Chain O'Lakes found along the Fox River, serves as an aquatic mecca for boating and summer leisure while skiing and snowmobiling abound during the winter months. Along with neighboring Fox Lake, Antioch has become host to numerous pro and amateur national fishing tournaments.

Kite flying is also a popular sporting event on Loon Lake during Labor Day Weekend. Currently, the Swiss Kiting Federation holds the record for the longest kite flight of 1 hour and 24 minutes.
The village is bordered by four holdings of the Lake County Forest Preserve District, an award-winning and nationally recognized land conservation organization.

Government

Elected officials 
The village of Antioch is a non-home rule municipality which functions under the council-manager form of government with a village President and a six-member Board of Trustees, all of whom are elected to four-year terms. The Village President and three of the Trustees are elected every four years. The other group of three Trustees are also elected for four-year terms, but this election is staggered and takes place two years after the first group.

Schools 
Public schools
Elementary Schools
 W.C. Petty Elementary School (K-5)
 Hillcrest Elementary School (PK-5)
 Oakland Elementary School in Lake Villa, Illinois (K-5)
 Antioch Elementary School (K-5)
 Emmons Grade School (K-8)
 Grass Lake Elementary School (PK-8)
 Millburn Elementary School in Old Mill Creek, Illinois (PK-5)

Middle Schools
 Antioch Upper Grade School (6-8)
 Peter J. Palombi School in Lake Villa, Illinois (7-8)
 Millburn Middle School in Lindenhurst, Illinois (6-8)
 Beach Park Middle School in Beach Park, Illinois (6-8)

High School (9-12)
 Antioch Community High School
 Lakes Community High School in Lake Villa, Illinois, child of Antioch Community High School

Private schools 
Private middle schools:
 Faith Evangelical Lutheran School (Grades PK-8) CLOSED
 St. Peter Catholic School (Grades PK-8) CLOSED

Infrastructure

Transportation and Transit

Metra service is provided from Antioch to Chicago Union Station via the North Central Service. Bus service within Antioch and throughout Lake County is provided by Pace.

Western Kenosha County Transit Route 2 serves parts of Antioch Monday-Saturday, connecting riders to several towns, villages and unincorporated municipalities throughout Kenosha County. Riders can also transfer to Route 1 and Route 3 to travel to Kenosha and Lake Geneva, respectively.

Antioch is located approximately 43 miles north of Chicago O'Hare International Airport and 40 miles south of General Mitchell International Airport in Milwaukee.

Major streets
Several major highways and state routes cross over and travel around Antioch.

Public safety
The Antioch Police Department (APD) is responsible for law enforcement in Antioch.

The Antioch Fire Department provides fire and emergency medical services with contract service, part time and paid on call firefighters and Paramedics. The fire department currently uses 3 fire stations to house its different equipment, and all 3 are staffed with personnel. Antioch Fire Department has an array of equipment to use including several engines, 2 water tenders, 2 boats including an air boat, and a six-wheeled vehicle to access hard to reach areas. Antioch Fire Dept. also owns several pieces of special equipment including new state of the art extrication equipment used to extricate injured people from wrecked cars. The Antioch First Fire Protection District was the first organized fire protection district in the state. The Fire Department also has an Explorer post for youths ages 15 to 20 interested in making the fire service a career.

Until 2014, EMS was provided by the volunteer Antioch Rescue Squad. The Antioch Rescue Squad was the first licensed paramedic unit in the State of Illinois.

The police department and the fire department are housed in separate buildings next to each other. The Antioch Village Board elected to close the communication center in 2012, electing to outsource all of its 911 emergency dispatch service (Police, Fire, and Rescue) to another center located in Round Lake Beach. In March 1993, the Antioch Police Department became a part of the Lake County Enhanced 911 system.

Notable people 

 Dale Barnstable (1925-2019), two time NCAA Basketball champion at University of Kentucky, drafted by the Boston Celtics, but never played professionally due to a point shaving scandal
 Tiffany Brooks (born 1979) winner of 2013 HGTV Design Star
 Paul DeJong (born 1993), Major League Baseball infielder for the St. Louis Cardinals.
 Joe Gliniewicz (1963-2015), Fox Lake, Illinois police officer who staged his own suicide is buried in Antioch 
 Fred Hawkins (1923-2014), PGA Tour golfer
 Jim McMillen (1902-1984), guard for Chicago Bears for seven seasons; also former mayor of Antioch
 Kyle Rittenhouse (born 2003), Antioch native and political figure who, at the age of 17, shot and killed two people and wounded another in self defense during multiple confrontations during the 2020 Kenosha unrest
 John Thain (born 1955), Chairman and former CEO of CIT Group, former CEO of Merrill Lynch, former CEO of the New York Stock Exchange
 Tom Wittum (1950-2010), football player for San Francisco 49ers

References

External links
 Village of Antioch
 Antioch Chamber of Commerce and Industry
 

 
Populated places established in 1839
Villages in Illinois
Villages in Lake County, Illinois
1839 establishments in Illinois